Most Precious Blood can refer to:
The Eucharist, a rite in Christianity
Most Precious Blood (band)
Most Precious Blood (album), released by Indecision (band)